Lazar Kukić (born 12 December 1995) is a Serbian handball player who plays for CS Dinamo Bucuresti and the Serbia national team.

Career
After coming through the youth system at Partizan, Kukić was promoted to the first team in the 2013–14 season. He signed with Spanish club BM Logroño La Rioja in early 2017.

A Serbia international since 2016, Kukić participated at the 2019 World Men's Handball Championship and 2020 European Men's Handball Championship.

Honours
Benfica
EHF European League: 2021–22

References

External links
 EHF record

1995 births
Living people
Handball players from Belgrade
Serbian male handball players
RK Partizan players
Liga ASOBAL players
Expatriate handball players
Serbian expatriate sportspeople in Spain
Serbian expatriate sportspeople in Portugal